Chris Winter is an American college football coach. He was named the head football coach in 2021 at Wartburg College in Waverly, Iowa, after serving as an assistant since under former head football coach Rick Willis. In just his second year at the helm of Wartburg Knights, he lead them to a program record 13 wins and to the first NCAA Division III Semifinal appearance in school history.

Winter was born in New Hampton, Iowa. He attended Wartburg, where he played football and baseball, earning all-conference honors in both sports. He was named to the Wartburg College Athletics Hall of Fame in 2017.  Following the 2022 season, Chris Winter was named the D3football.com National football coach of the year.

Head coaching record

References

Further reading
 

Year of birth missing (living people)
Living people
American football wide receivers
Baseball third basemen
Wartburg Knights baseball players
Wartburg Knights football players
Wartburg Knights football coaches
People from New Hampton, Iowa
Coaches of American football from Iowa
Players of American football from Iowa
Baseball players from Iowa
Wartburg College alumni